Alenka Goljevšček (7 September 1933 – 17 January 2017) was a Slovene writer, essayist and playwright.

She won the Levstik Award in 1988 for her book on Slovene mythology Med bogovi in demoni (Amongst Gods and Daemons). She is also a playwright.

Her husband was the literary historian, philosopher and essayist Taras Kermauner. She died on 17 January 2017.

Bibliography

Youth fiction
 Čudozgode (Wonderstories), 1974
 Po štirih, po dveh (On Four Legs, On Two Legs), 1996

Youth plays
 Čudežni kamen (The Magic Stone), 1979
 Če zmaj požre mamo (When the Dragon Eats Mother), 1981
 Hiša (The House), 1981
 Kralj Matjaž, kako se imaš? (King Matjaž How Are You?), 1981
 Volk in rdeča kapica (The Wolf and Little red Riding Hood), 1982
 Zakaj avto zjutraj noče vžgati (Why the Car Won't Start in the Morning), 1982 
 Gornastenisedimuha (Theflyonthewall) 1983

Adult plays 
 Srečanje na Osojah (Meeting in Osoje), 1981
 Pod Prešernovo glavo (Under Prešeren's Bust), 1984
 Zelena je moja dolina (Green is My Valley), 1985
 Lepa Vida 87 (The Beautiful Vida 87), 1987
 Srečna draga vas domača (Happy Beloved Home Village), 1999

Monographs 
 Mit in slovenska ljudska pesem (Myth and Slovene Traditional Songs), 1982
 Med bogovi in demoni: liki iz slovenske mitologije (Amongst Gods and Daemons: Figures from Slovene Mythology), 1988
 Pravljice, kaj ste? (Fairytales What Are You?), 1991
 New age in krščanstvo (New Age and Christianity), 1992

References

1933 births
2017 deaths
Slovenian dramatists and playwrights
Slovenian essayists
Levstik Award laureates
Writers from Ljubljana
Slovenian women essayists
Women dramatists and playwrights
20th-century Slovenian women writers
20th-century Slovenian writers
21st-century Slovenian women writers
21st-century Slovenian writers